James Christopher Healey (December 24, 1909 – December 16, 1981) was a lawyer and Democratic Party political figure in New York. He was most notable for his nine years as a Congressman from a district based in the Bronx during the mid-20th century.

Early life
He was born in the Bronx.  He graduated from the University of Pennsylvania in 1933 and St. John's University School of Law in 1936.  Healey attended the University of Pennsylvania on a track and field scholarship, and was a member of relay teams that set records for the one-mile run.  For several years, he was active as an official for the Amateur Athletic Union.

He was an attorney for the New York State Labor Relations Board from 1938 to 1940.  He was an assistant United States attorney for the Southern District of New York from 1940 until 1943.

Military service
Healey joined the United States Navy for World War II; he served from 1943 to 1946, including assignment to Europe, and attained the rank of lieutenant.

Post-World War II
From 1946 to 1948, Healey was assistant corporation counsel for the city of New York.  From 1948 to 1956, he was counsel to James J. Lyons, the Bronx borough president, and was recognized as a protégé of Bronx Democratic leader Charles A. Buckley.

Congressional career
In 1956, Healey was elected to Congress in a special election held to fill the vacancy caused by the resignation of Sidney A. Fine.  He was elected to a full term in 1956, was reelected three times, and served from February 7, 1956, until January 3, 1965.  Healey suffered a stroke in 1963; he recovered in time to mount a campaign for reelection in 1964, but was an unsuccessful candidate for renomination.

Healey was a delegate to the Democratic National Conventions of 1956, 1960, and 1968.

Retirement and death
In retirement, Healey was a resident of Southampton, New York.  He died there on December 16, 1981, and was buried at Sacred Hearts of Jesus & Mary Roman Catholic Cemetery in Southampton.

Family
Healey was married twice; in 1938 he married Eleanor R. Callahan, the daughter of Bronx political figure Joseph M. Callahan.  After her death in 1956, Healey married Mollie Allen, who survived him.

With his first wife, Healey was the father of four: James C., John J., Joseph, and Elizabeth Jane Healey Mulvihill.

Healey had two brothers, Thomas M., and Vincent P.; Vincent was a United States Navy officer who retired with the rank of rear admiral.

References

Sources

Newspapers

Books

External sources

1909 births
1981 deaths
University of Pennsylvania alumni
St. John's University School of Law alumni
New York (state) lawyers
United States Navy personnel of World War II
Democratic Party members of the United States House of Representatives from New York (state)
20th-century American lawyers
20th-century American politicians
Politicians from the Bronx
United States Navy officers